Francis Rea MacMillen (14 October 1885, in Marietta, Ohio – 14 July 1973, in Lausanne) was an American violinist.

In the fall of 1902, he made his debut in a Vauxhall in Brussels, followed by a concert tour through Belgium, Germany and England. In the fall of 1903, he played in London and undertook another concert tour through England. His American debut took place on December 7, 1906 at Carnegie Hall with the New York Symphony Society under the direction of Walter Damrosch. This was followed by an extensive tour with 98 concerts in the East and the Midwest of the United States. In the summer of 1907, he returned to London, where he played three concerts with the Queen's Hall Orchestra under the direction of Henry Wood. Onward, he played in the United States and Europe accompanied by Swiss pianist Johnny Aubert. In November and December 1910 he played again with the New York Symphony Orchestra, conducted by Gustav Mahler. He is also the author of several compositions for the violin: Barcarole, Serenade Nègre, Causerie, Liebeslied, Nijinsky et al.

Further reading 
 Oscar Thompson (edit.), Nicolas Slonimsky (edit.): MacMillen, Francis. In The International Cyclopedia of Music and Musicians, 4th edition, Dodd, Mead & Company, New York 1946, .
 Francis MacMillen: Art and Immortality, in The Violinist, December 1924.
 William Lines Hubbard (edit.), George Whitfield Andrews (edit.), Edward Dickinson (edit.), Arthur Foote (edit.), Janet M Green (edit.), Josephine Thrall (edit.) and Emil Liebling (edit.): MacMillen, Francis. In The American History and Encyclopedia of Music, VOl. 6, New York 1908,  (Numerised.)
 J. A. Fuller Maitland (edit.), Waldo Selden Pratt (edit.), Charles N. Boyd (edit.): MacMillen, Francis. In: Grove’s Dictionary of Music and Musicians, vol. 6, American Supplement, Theodore Presser Company, Philadelphia, PA. 1920,  (Numerised)

References 

1885 births
1973 deaths
American classical violinists
20th-century classical composers
People from Marietta, Ohio
American classical composers
20th-century classical violinists
Male classical violinists
20th-century American male musicians
20th-century American violinists